Woodson's Mill, also known as Piney River Mill, is a historic grist mill located at Lowesville, Nelson County, Virginia. It is believed to have been built originally for Guiliford Campbell in 1794. The present building has undergone three periods of structural and mechanical improvements, most of which date to the nineteenth century.  Sometime after 1900, Dr. Julian B. Woodson added a sophisticated roller mill system for the production of fine white flour and he built his office into the west end of the mill.  The mill continues to function with two water wheels and houses an operating cider press.

It was listed on the National Register of Historic Places in 1992.

References

External links

Documentary about the mill at Flickr
The complete documentary at YouTube

Grinding mills on the National Register of Historic Places in Virginia
National Register of Historic Places in Nelson County, Virginia
Buildings and structures in Nelson County, Virginia
Grinding mills in Virginia
Industrial buildings completed in 1794
1794 establishments in Virginia